Aechmea dealbata is a bromeliad in the subfamily Bromelioideae.  This plant species has spiny green foliage with a complex pink and purple inflorescence. It is epiphytic but will grow in soil and is commonly cultivated. This species is endemic to the State of Rio de Janeiro in Brazil.

Cultivars
 Aechmea 'Bill Hobbs'
 Aechmea 'Electrica (Electra)'
 Aechmea 'Fireman Sam'
 Aechmea 'Margarita L.'
 Aechmea 'Morris Henry Hobbs'
 Aechmea 'Ralph Davis'

References

External links

dealbata
Flora of Brazil
Epiphytes
Plants described in 1889